Visakhapatnam–Bhagat Ki Kothi Express is an express train in India which runs between Visakhapatnam in Andhra Pradesh and  in Rajasthan. It was introduced on 2 January 2014. The Waltair railway division of the East Coast Railway division of the Indian Railways administers this train.

Special runs and inaugural

It operates as train number 18573 from Visakhapatnam to Bhagat Ki Kothi and as train number 18574. It first ran as holiday special from Visakhapatnam on 19–20 December 2013. Later it was inaugurated on 24 December by Union minister of state for commerce and industry, D.Purandeswari with train number as 08575. Its regular run commenced on 2 January 2014 with train numbers 18573/18574.

Coaches
During holiday special run Visakhapatnam-Bhagat ki kothi Express has one AC 2tier, two AC 3tier, Eleven Sleeper, Six General unreserved and two guard cum luggage vans. Total composition is 22 Coaches.

There was an inaugural special run on 24 December 2013. It has one AC2-tier, one AC3-tier, Eight sleeper class, four general second class and two guard cum luggage vans. The total composition is 16 coaches.

During regular run, it consists of 1 AC1 tier,3 AC2-tier, 4 AC3-tier, 10 sleeper, Six general second and two guard cum luggage vans. The total composition is 20 coaches.

Route
The Visakhapatnam-Bhagat ki kothi Express covers the distance of 2074 km in 41 hours 10 mins on journey towards Bhagat Ki Kothi and in 42 hours 5 mins on journey towards Visakhapatnam. 18573/18574 Visakhapatnam-Bhagat ki kothi Express averaging 50 km/hr on journey towards Bhagat Ki Kothi and averaging 49 km/hr on journey towards Visakhapatnam. This train starts from Visakhapatnam at 05:35 on every Thursday and reaches Bhagat Ki Kothi at 22:45 hrs on every Friday. In return journey it starts Bhagat Ki Kothi at 14:15 on every Saturday and reaches Visakhapatnam at 08:10 on every Monday. The train runs via Vizianagaram, Parvathipuram, Rayagada, Titlagarh, Raipur, Katni, Kota, Sawai Madhopur, Jaipur, Degana Junction railway station, Jodhpur. It has loco reversal at Raipur, Kota, Sawai Madhopur.

Schedule

Reversals

 Raipur Junction
 Kota Junction
 Sawai Madhopur Junction

Traction
It is hauled by Electric Loco from Visakhapatnam to Sawai Madhopur and Diesel loco from Sawai Madhopur to Bhagat Ki Kothi.

References

Express trains in India
Rail transport in Rajasthan
Rail transport in Andhra Pradesh
Rail transport in Odisha
Rail transport in Chhattisgarh
Rail transport in Madhya Pradesh
Transport in Visakhapatnam
Transport in Jodhpur